The Poet Laureate of Arkansas is the poet laureate for the U.S. state of Arkansas. Charles T. Davis was the first until his death on December 21, 1945. The current Poet Laureate of Arkansas is Suzanne Underwood Rhodes, who was appointed to a four-year term in 2022.

List of Poets Laureate 
 Charles T. Davis (1923-1945)
 Rosa Zagnoni Marinoni (1953-1970)
 Ercil Brown (interim appointee, 1970-1971)
 Lily Peter (1971-1991)
 Verna Lee Hinegardner (1991-2003)
 Peggy Vining (2003-2017)
 Jo Garret McDougall (2018-2022)
 Suzanne Underwood Rhodes (2022-present)

See also

 Poet laureate
 List of U.S. states' poets laureate
 United States Poet Laureate

References

 
Arkansas culture
American Poets Laureate